From April 4–5, 2022, a mesoscale convective system and numerous discrete supercells produced a swath of severe weather and several tornadoes in the Southeastern United States, including several strong, long tracked tornadoes. An EF3 tornado damaged or destroyed several homes in Bonaire, Georgia while a large EF3 tornado prompted a tornado emergency for Allendale and Sycamore, South Carolina. A violent EF4 tornado in Black Creek, Georgia resulted in one fatality as it destroyed several neighborhoods, and another large EF3 tornado caused widespread heavy tree damage northeast of Ulmer, South Carolina. More severe storms occurred across a large portion of the Southeast ahead of a cold front on April 6–7, with more tornadoes reported in South and Central Georgia and further south into Florida, all of which were weak. Along with the one tornadic death, trees felled by straight-line winds killed one person each in Louisiana and Texas.

Meteorological synopsis

April 4–5

For the third time in a three-week period, environmental conditions across the Southeastern United States became favorable for a widespread severe weather and tornado outbreak during the early days of April. For days, forecasters at the Storm Prediction Center advertised the eastward progression of a broad upper-level trough into the South Plains region. As this occurred, they forecasted the development of an area of low pressure in northwestern Texas along a stalled front. To the south of this northward-propagating boundary, surface temperatures rose to around  while rapidly-cooling air aloft led to the development of 1,500–2,000 J/kg mid-level convective available potential energy (CAPE). With modest advection of warm air and an eroding capping inversion, widespread convective development overspread northwestern Texas and southwestern Oklahoma, with a primary risk of very large hail and damaging wind gusts. Farther southeast in the vicinity of the Dallas–Fort Worth metroplex, forecasters warned of the potential for a higher tornadic threat given an approaching shortwave trough, better northward transport of moisture, and a strengthening of low-level wind fields. A long-lived embedded supercell developed south of the metroplex, producing multiple tornadoes. One of tornadoes reached EF2 intensity near Egan, causing severe damage and injuring one person. Otherwise, widespread convective activity congealed into a southeast-moving mesoscale convective system across eastern Texas and Louisiana through the overnight hours, where the SPC had placed an level 3 Enhanced risk for the threat of damaging winds. Dozens of severe wind gusts were recorded.

Into the morning hours, the progressive squall line lost some of its intensity as it moved across the Ark-La-Tex region. However, with increasing wind fields and deeply moist dew points above , the SPC anticipated re-intensification of this feature through the afternoon, plus an attendant risk for discrete supercells in advance of the line. Accordingly, they yet again outlined a level 3/Enhanced risk of severe weather, including a more substantial threat for tornadoes, some EF2 or stronger, from the Mississippi–Alabama border eastward to the coastal border of Georgia and South Carolina. A bowing complex evolved across southern Alabama into Georgia while leading supercells evolved in advance of the line, resulting in widespread damaging winds and numerous tornadoes, including multiple strong tornadoes. One high-end EF3 tornado embedded within the line destroyed multiple homes in Bonaire, Georgia, causing an injury. Farther northeast across South Carolina, a south-southwesterly low-level jet up to  overspread an unstable and moist environment, leading to the concern for supercells capable of producing strong tornadoes. Indeed, multiple discrete storms developed ahead of the advancing squall line in the warm sector across eastern Georgia and the South Carolina Lowcountry. These cells quickly intensified as they overspread the region, and produced multiple significant tornadoes, including multiple long-track, strong wedge tornadoes. A low-end EF3 tornado prompted the issuance of a tornado emergency for Allendale, South Carolina, while a violent EF4 tornado destroyed numerous homes and caused a fatality in Black Creek, Georgia. A high-end EF3 tornado then touched down in Allendale County near Ulmer a few hours later, before continuing into Bamberg and Orangeburg counties, causing substantial tree damage along its path. An EF2 tornado also inflicted heavy damage along in the western, northwestern, and northern parts of Manning, South Carolina. By the evening hours, these cells began to merge with the progressive squall line as it shifted into a more stable air mass and approached the Atlantic coastline.

April 6–7

After the previous days' storms advanced into the Atlantic Ocean, a new severe weather system developed over many of the same areas in Alabama, Georgia, and South Carolina. Remnants of storms from the previous day gave way for abundant moisture overspreading the area. This, combined with the presence of upper 60s F dew points and CAPE values of 2000-3000 J/kg, created a highly unstable atmosphere, conductive for severe weather. Given the favorable parameters for severe weather, the Storm Prediction Center issued a large Enhanced risk area, encompassing areas centered around Georgia, central and northeastern portions of Alabama, eastern Tennessee, extreme western North Carolina, and southern South Carolina. The outlook highlighted the high probabilities of damaging wind gusts to be the primary threat of the event, but a 10%, unhatched corridor for tornadoes was also situated along central Georgia.

As the evening advanced, destabilization in the area kept growing, and a long chain of thunderstorms developed along a corridor in central and southern Georgia. As such, the SPC issued a large tornado watch for central counties in Georgia, discussing the moderate possibilities for tornadoes to develop, but strong tornadoes were not thought to be likely. As this line segmented on the early evening, multiple supercell thunderstorms developed and matured on the area as they entered the favorable environment in central Georgia. As such, multiple tornadoes developed as a result. An EF1 tornado that developed in Lee County was documented by multiple storm chasers as it caused damage near the town of Cordele. Multiple other weak tornadoes were reported from these supercells along with numerous reports of damaging winds. More severe storms formed in Florida and the Eastern Carolinas during the afternoon of April 7, but no tornadoes were reported. The severe threat ended after the storms either moved offshore or weakened below severe limits.

Confirmed tornadoes

April 4 event

April 5 event

April 6 event

April 7 event

Pembroke–Black Creek, Georgia

This large, violent wedge tornado touched down just southwest of Pembroke at 5:18 p.m. EDT (21:18 UTC) and quickly strengthened to EF2 intensity as it moved into town. It inflicted significant damage to the Bryan County Courthouse, which had many windows blown out and lost a large portion of its roof. The Bryan County Jail was also damaged and fencing around the facility was destroyed. The Bryan County Planning and Zoning office was partially unroofed, and also sustained some collapse of exterior walls. A couple of older wood-frame homes were destroyed along South Main Street, multiple other structures and several vehicles in town were also damaged, and many trees and power lines were downed. Moving east-northeast, the tornado exited the town and maintained EF2 intensity as it crossed over a wooded, marshy area, flattening a swath of trees while also destroying an outbuilding along C C Road, and heavily damaging a house on Stubbs Farm Road. After moving north of Ellabell and entering the small community of Black Creek, the tornado rapidly intensified and moved through George D. Hendrix Park at EF3 intensity. A large recreation center building was heavily damaged at this location, sustaining roof loss and collapse of exterior walls, with portions of its metal framing being twisted. Reinforced concrete light poles were snapped at the base, multiple large trees were snapped, denuded, and partially debarked, and turf at a football field in the park was also damaged. Several well-built homes here were completely destroyed, four of which were leveled, including two that were completely swept away with only their bare concrete slab foundations remaining. These homes were anchor-bolted to their foundations, though there was no contextual damage evidence to support a rating above EF4. Multiple other homes sustained major damage in the Park Place subdivision, some of which had roofs and exterior walls ripped off. Several people were left trapped under the rubble of their damaged or destroyed homes and had to be extracted by rescue crews. No fatalities occurred in the Park Place subdivision, though there were multiple serious injuries.

The violent tornado then crossed over Wilma Edwards Road onto the Black Creek Golf Course, where many trees were snapped and partially debarked, a golf cart barn was completely destroyed, and a clubhouse building sustained severe structural damage. Some homes at the golf course on Worthington Drive and Wellington Court were impacted by the southern edge of the circulation and sustained considerable roof and exterior damage. The tornado then weakened but remained strong as it moved further to the east-northeast, mowing down more trees as it moved through another wooded and marshy area. It then crossed over McCown Lane and Olive Branch Road before striking a mobile home park along the southern end of Homestead Drive at EF3 intensity. Several well-anchored mobile homes were destroyed after being thrown or rolled. Some outbuildings were destroyed, and storage trailers were overturned as well. A woman was killed in one of the destroyed mobile homes, and multiple injuries occurred throughout this area. Several videos then showed the weakening tornado crossing I-16 at the US 280 exit. Along the east side of the interstate, the tornado caused EF1 damage to some large warehouses, ripped part of the roof off a AGCO company building at Oracal Parkway Circle, and inflicted considerable damage to trees. It then dissipated after crossing the road at 5:33 p.m. EDT (21:33 UTC), having travelled . In addition to the fatality, at least 12 people were injured. Coupled with the EF4 tornado that struck Newnan the previous year, this event marked the first time that F4/EF4 tornadoes had struck Georgia in back-to-back years since modern records began in 1950.

Non-tornadic impacts

The severe squall line that formed in Central Texas on April 4 moved eastward, producing a swath of damaging  straight line winds in Kaufman County between Scurry and Kemp. There was damage to trees and signs along with minor roof damage. Another area of even stronger winds of  winds moved across southeastern Van Zandt County. Trees were damaged, metal structures/barns were damaged or destroyed, and the roofs of some homes were damaged. Another area of wind damage struck Whitehouse, knocking down numerous trees, four of which landed on homes. A fatality was confirmed in one of the houses. The severe squall line continued to produce wind damage as it moved into southern Arkansas and northern Louisiana early on April 5. Northeast of Minden, Louisiana, a motorist was killed when they struck a tree that had fallen across US 79. Although an EF1 tornado was confirmed in Union Parish, the entire southern half of the parish suffered heavy straight-line wind damage. Severe storms also formed ahead of the line, producing wind damage and large to very large hail in the central portions of Mississippi and Alabama. The squall line produced  straight-line winds south of Beatrice, Alabama prior to producing an EF1 tornado to the northeast. Pine trees were snapped or uprooted due to these strong winds.

The tornadic thunderstorms that day also produced other severe weather. The storm that produced the Pembroke–Black Creek, Georgia EF4 tornado produced  hail that damaged vehicles north of Ellabell. The storm was tornado warned until it moved into the Atlantic Ocean in Charleston, South Carolina, but no tornadoes were confirmed. However, severe winds downed many trees and power lines from Rincon, Georgia through Beaufort, South Carolina to Charleston. Several aircraft on the USS Yorktown were moved, three trees at the Civil War Memorial were blown down, and the west stand of the Patriots Point Soccer Complex on Patriots Point was heavily damaged. Isolated severe storms also occurred in Missouri, northern Arkansas, and South Texas. A severe storm east of Kansas City near Pilot Grove produced  winds, knocked down power lines on Route 135, and ripped part of the roof off a barn. The storm also triggered a tornado warning, but no tornadoes were confirmed. Another severe storm in northern Arkansas produced multiple instances of large hail into the overnight hours of April 5–6. The storm was also briefly tornado-warned, but no tornadoes touched down. On April 7, rain connected to the system affected the Northeastern United States, forcing the New York Yankees to postpone their home opener against the Boston Red Sox until the next day. Pennsylvania Route 611 closed due to flooding afterwards.

Aftermath
Soon after the EF4 tornado in Bryan County, Georgia, a state of emergency was set in place for the Pembroke and Ellabell areas. The American Red Cross set up temporary shelters for displaced citizens, and a curfew was also put in place for the area. Search and rescue teams from numerous neighboring towns came to aid in sweeping the area for injuries and aiding victims. Multiple GoFundMe donation pages also reached support in the thousands as the pages spread through social media.

Following the tornadoes in Allendale County, South Carolina, the governor of South Carolina, Henry McMaster, was asked the declare the area as state of emergency by representative Justin Bamberg. The American Red Cross swiftly set up temporary shelters to aid families. All Allendale county schools were closed following the tornado as well.

See also

 Weather of 2022
 List of North American tornadoes and tornado outbreaks
 List of F4 and EF4 tornadoes (2020–present)
 List of United States tornadoes in April 2022

Notes

References 

2022 meteorology
2022 natural disasters in the United States
April 2022 events in the United States
Tornadoes of 2022
Tornado outbreaks
Satellite tornadoes
Tornadoes in Alabama
2022 in Alabama
Tornadoes in Georgia (U.S. state)
2022 in Georgia (U.S. state)
Tornadoes in Mississippi
2022 in Mississippi
Tornadoes in Louisiana
2022 in Louisiana
Tornadoes in South Carolina
2022 in South Carolina
Tornadoes in Texas
2022 in Texas
F4 tornadoes